Argyrotaenia chillana is a species of moth of the family Tortricidae. It is found in Ecuador.

References

C
Endemic fauna of Ecuador
Tortricidae of South America
Moths described in 1999